Thiruppalai is an area situated in the north of Madurai, Tamil Nadu, India. Parts of the village are included in Samayanallur  constituency and Madurai constituency. In 2011, its village panchayat was dissolved and merged with Madurai Corporation.  The main occupation of this village is farming but due to urbanization, some of the agricultural land is being sold for non-agricultural purposes.

History 
 As per earliest account of history, Thiruppalai village was purchased by Madurai Sultanate from then king Koon Pandiyan along with other five villages including Goripalayam Mosque.

Educational institutions
Yadava College
E.M.G. Yadava Women's College
Jain Vidyalaya Matriculation Hr. Sec. School
 Sri Ram Nallamani Teacher Training School
 Vellammal memorial matriculation school
government Hr.sec school.

Places of worship
 Thiruppalai Krishnan Temple, New Natham Road
 Iskcon Temple, New Natham Road
 Manthaiyamman Temple, 
 sri thotichieamman Temple,(ayyakonar veera vagarai)
 Nondiswamy temple
 Nagarani Amman Temple
 Perumal Temple
 St.Peters Church, CSI
 Thirupalai jumma mosque

References

Neighbourhoods and suburbs of Madurai

4*sri thotchieamman temple :these temple was located in thirupalai village. it was a very power full god & it was a family god for ayyakonar groups who were most populated group in thiruplai & in vadaikumasi veethi the god was also more powefull & very old god in thiruplaia .in all friday& tuesday special pooja will be done for the good.